Caracal Energy plc is a Canadian oil exploration and development business with operations in Chad. It was acquired by Glencore in 2014.

History
The company was formed by Brad Griffiths as Griffiths Energy International Inc in 2009. After Brad Griffiths was killed in a boating accident in 2011, the company changed its name to Caracal Energy.

In 2013 the company was fined C$10.35 million after allegedly making improper payments to the wife of Chad's ambassador to Canada.

In April 2014 Glencore made an offer to buy the company.

Operations
The company has oil exploration and development operations in Chad.

References

External links

Oil companies of Canada
Non-renewable resource companies established in 2009